The Main Mall was an outdoor pedestrian shopping plaza in downtown Poughkeepsie, New York, which was in existence from 1973 until 2001. An urban renewal project designed with the intention of stopping the decline of the central business district of downtown Poughkeepsie, the mall was created by blocking off a section of Main Street (from Market to Catherine/Academy Streets) to automobile traffic.

Early years
The Main Mall was the centerpiece of a project which also included the improvement of US 9 in the Poughkeepsie city limits to a freeway-standard highway and construction of The Arterial, a combination of Routes 44 and 55 into two one-way, three lane highways a block to the north and south of Main Street. At the time of the project, downtown Poughkeepsie was faced with the competition of the Poughkeepsie Plaza Mall on Route 9 as well as Dutchess Mall ten miles south Route 9 in Fishkill. In the first years after its opening, many ceremonies, promotions, and festivals took place on the mall, with it also being the site of many United States Bicentennial festivities as well. These occurrences softened the sting of Dutchess Mall's presence in the early years of both venues. The moving of the de facto bus station and the transfer point for the former City of Poughkeepsie Transit and the current Dutchess County Public Transit bus systems to the Market Street end of the mall also softened the sting to some degree.

Even with this minor success, the mall was beset with various access problems. The number of legal parking spots in the vicinity of the Main Mall were too few to handle even a moderate number of people. Delays in the construction of the Route 44/55 arterial pushed its finish date to 1979 which, coupled with the closure of Main Street in that area, made access to the area very difficult and led to frequent congestion of side streets not equipped to handle such traffic.

Decline
In 1974, South Hills Mall opened five miles from the Main Mall off Route 9 in the southern part of the Town of Poughkeepsie. The opening of the mall led to an exodus of both shoppers and businesses from downtown. Over the next several years, many more businesses either closed their doors or relocated elsewhere and the Main Street area developed problems with homelessness and vagrancy. The final straw came in early 1981 when Poughkeepsie fixture Luckey Platt department store closed its large location on the east end of the Mall at Academy Street. Shortly after the Luckey Platt closure, the Dutchess County Department of Social Services moved their offices to a location on the opposite side of the mall from that building. As seen with indoor malls and outdoor strip malls, the loss of a primary commercial store anchor played a role in the Main mall's decline during the 1980s.

Later years

With the election of mayor Colette Lafuente in 1995, the future of the Main Mall was brought into question. Lafuente had a plan to revitalize the City of Poughkeepsie by a process that would replace blighted areas with new housing and businesses. A native to the area, Lafuente had an intention to plant the seeds that would return Main Street to its prominence and such a plan would involve the elimination of the Main Mall.

In early 2001, the Main Mall was closed and Main Street between Catharine/Academy and Market streets was reconstructed as a two-lane street with ample on-street parking; the remaining business in what had been the mall stayed open during the construction. The Main Mall officially went into history in November 2001 when Main Street was once again made whole.  With the removal of the mall downtown Poughkeepsie began its recovery and is now attracting new businesses, stores, restaurants and galleries.

References

Shopping malls established in 1973
Buildings and structures in Poughkeepsie, New York
2001 disestablishments in New York (state)
Pedestrian malls in the United States